Richard Lai Sung-lung, (4 August 194627 March 2008) was a former member of the Legislative Council of Hong Kong.

Lai was born in Shanghai in a family doing jewellery and property business before he moved to Hong Kong in 1950. He studied textile industries at the Bolton Institute of Technology and Leeds University and worked as the director in textile companies.

He was also the fellow of the Institution of Works Manager, Textile Institute, Institution of Industrial Managers and British Institute of Management. He served as the vice-chairman of the Hong Kong Productivity Council.

He was appointed to the Tsuen Wan District Board and elected to the Legislative Council in the indirect election in 1985 through South New Territories electoral college constituency consisting of members of the Tsuen Wan and Sai Kung District Board. He failed to be reelected in 1988.

He joined the United Democrats of Hong Kong, the first major pro-democratic party in 1990 but quit in 1991.

References

1946 births
2008 deaths
Hong Kong textiles industry businesspeople
Alumni of the University of Leeds
Alumni of the University of Bolton
District councillors of Tsuen Wan District
Hong Kong Association for Democracy and People's Livelihood politicians
United Democrats of Hong Kong politicians
HK LegCo Members 1985–1988